Peter McDermott (born 27 January 1996) is an English cricketer. He made his first-class debut on 28 March 2017 for Leeds/Bradford MCCU against Kent as part of the Marylebone Cricket Club University fixtures.

References

External links
 

1996 births
Living people
English cricketers
Leeds/Bradford MCCU cricketers
Place of birth missing (living people)